is a public Japanese multinational retail holding company.

In addition to its primary subsidiary Uniqlo, it owns several other brands, including J Brand, Comptoir des Cotonniers, GU, Princesse Tam-Tam, and Theory.

History
The company was founded as Men's Shop Ogori Shoji in 1949, and formally incorporated as Ogōri Shōji Co., Ltd. in 1963 by Hitoshi Yanai.

In 1984, the company, which ran a menswear store in  Ube, Yamaguchi, opened a new casual-wear store named Unique Clothing Warehouse in Hiroshima City; this was the forebear of Uniqlo.

In September 1991, Ogori Shoji changed its name to Fast Retailing Co., Ltd., and was listed on the Hiroshima Stock Exchange in July 1994.

In February 1999, it was listed on the first section (large companies) of the Tokyo Stock Exchange.

The company also owns the American brand Theory; Fast Retailing acquired "an equity stake in Link Theory Holdings Co Ltd, the marketer of the Theory and Helmut Lang apparel brands, in 2004". It acquired the rest of the company in 2009.

In 2007, it unsuccessfully offered a bid of US$900 million for Barneys New York department store to the Jones Apparel Group.

In 2012, the company purchased an 80% stake of premium denim company J Brand for US$290 million and US$10 million in advisory legal fees.

Senior leadership

Chairman 

 Hitoshi Yanai (1963–1984)
 Tadashi Yanai (1984–present)

CEO 
 Hitoshi Yanai (1963–1984)
 Tadashi Yanai (1984–present)

President 

 Hitoshi Yanai (1963–1984)
 Tadashi Yanai (1984–2002)
 Genichi Tamatsuka (2002–2005)
 Tadashi Yanai (2005–present); second term

References

External links
 English page
 Japanese page

 
Clothing retailers of Japan
Companies based in Yamaguchi Prefecture
Retail companies established in 1963
Holding companies of Japan
Companies listed on the Tokyo Stock Exchange
Companies listed on the Hong Kong Stock Exchange
Japanese companies established in 1963
Holding companies established in 1963